Layla Abdulla Yousif Al-Fakhro was a pioneering Bahraini woman who was an educator and a freedom fighter. She has taken part in the Dhofar Rebellion in Oman in the 1960s and has established the first [School of the Revolution] through which much of the current top echelon of Omani government and enterprise have passed through, providing the basis of a modern educational system in Oman. These enterprises have made Ms. Fakhro a legend throughout the Arab world in general, and the Gulf in particular.

Layla Fakhro was born in 1945 in Muharraq island in Bahrain. She died after a long illness on 21 September 2006.  She is survived by her two daughters, Munira and Aysha, and husband Ubaiydli Al-Ubaiydli.

Bio
 Held a master's degree in statistics from the American University of Beirut, Lebanon
 Held a license in statistics from Al-Muntassiria University in Baghdad, Iraq
 got involved in political activities in Bahrain in 1964
 was a leader in student movements and activist while studying in Beirut in the 1960s
 was the head of the cultural committee from 1967 - 1968 while at university in Beirut
 joined the armed struggle against the British in Dhofar, the Sultanate of Oman
 established the Awal Women's Society in Bahrain in 1968
 established the Revolutionary Schools in the Sultanate of Oman
 established the modern educational system in the Sultanate of Oman
 established the Delmon Publishing House in Cyprus while in exile
 exiled from Bahrain for more than 25 years due to her political activities
 established Alnadeem Information Technology company with her husband and other partners on her return to Bahrain in 1995

Bahraini left-wing activists
1945 births
2006 deaths
People of the Dhofar Rebellion
American University of Beirut alumni
Women in war in the Middle East
Women in warfare post-1945